Chalcophoropsis is a genus of beetles in the family Buprestidae, containing the following species:

 Chalcophoropsis monochroma Gianasso, 1999
 Chalcophoropsis quadrifoveolata (Laporte & Gory, 1836)

References

Buprestidae genera